Christ Episcopal Church is an historic Episcopal church at 120 N. New Hampshire Street in Covington, Louisiana.

The church was built in 1846 by Jonathan Arthur of London for descendants of English settlers in British West Florida (1763–1783). It was consecrated by Bishop Leonidas Polk on April 11, 1847, Christ Church is the oldest public building being used in Covington.

See also
National Register of Historic Places listings in St. Tammany Parish, Louisiana

References 

English-American culture in Louisiana
Churches completed in 1847
Episcopal church buildings in Louisiana
Greek Revival church buildings in Louisiana
Churches on the National Register of Historic Places in Louisiana
Churches in St. Tammany Parish, Louisiana
19th-century Episcopal church buildings
1847 establishments in Louisiana
National Register of Historic Places in St. Tammany Parish, Louisiana